Blue Raincoat Theatre Company is a professional theatre company based in Sligo, Ireland.

Founded in 1991, Blue Raincoat has staged 63 productions, 14 of which were world premieres. The company is a venue-based theatre ensemble, and performs primarily in The Factory Performance Space in Sligo, although it also tours throughout Ireland.  The Factory Performance Space was originally a warehouse dating to the 1800s, but it was converted to a performance and training center during the 1990s.  The Blue Raincoat Theatre Company won the national AIB "Better Ireland" award for the development project in 1999.

The company's other performance venues include the National Theatre of Ireland and the Dublin Theatre Festival. Blue Raincoat has also performed at theatres in London, Berlin, Warsaw, Madrid, Bucharest and Sofia. Blue Raincoat operate ongoing outreach programmes, national training seminars, internal training, the Cairde Community Festival and music events.

In 2013, Blue Raincoat began its season with Endgame by Samuel Beckett.

References

Further reading 

 Trench, Rhona, Blue Raincoat Theatre Company. (Dublin: Carysfort Press, 2015)

External links

 

Sligo (town)
Theatre companies in the Republic of Ireland